Gulfam is a first name and it may refer to:

Given name
Gulfam (writer) (1861–1936), Gujarati writer
Gulfam Khan (1975), Indian actress
Gulfam Joseph (1999), Pakistani sports shooter

Other
Gulfam, a 1994 studio album by the Indian singer Hariharan